The Bourne Brook or Black Brook, as it is known in its upper reaches, is a tributary of the River Tame in Staffordshire, England.

Course
From its source near Aldridge (originally in Staffordshire, but now in the West Midlands county), where it is known as the Black Brook, it flows north, to the west and north of the village of Shenstone, then flows east past Weeford and Hints where the name changes to the Bourne Brook. It then continues through the grounds of Drayton Manor Theme Park and then to its confluence with the River Tame near Fazeley.

Its waters ultimately flow, via the River Trent then the Humber, into the North Sea.

References

Rivers of Staffordshire
1BourneBrook